Marcus Cole Arroyo (born January 23, 1980) is an American football coach and former plauer. He served as the head football coach at the University of Nevada, Las Vegas (UNLV) from 2020 to 2022. Arroyo played college football as quarterback at San Jose State University. From 2004 to 2019, Arroyo was an assistant coach, most recently at the University of Oregon as offensive coordinator from 2017 to 2019.

Playing career
After graduating from Colfax High School in Colfax, California, Arroyo was the starting quarterback for the San Jose State Spartans from 1998 to 2002. He set many school records for passing, some of which are still unsurpassed. To this day, Arroyo ranks eighth in passing yards (4,603), ninth in completions (348) and total offense (4,525 yards), and tenth in passing efficiency (115.6). He still holds the school records for single-game passing efficiency and average yards per completion. Arroyo played in the NCAA Division I record-setting game against Nevada in 2001, where he threw five touchdowns and the teams put up the score 64–45, which set the record for most total offense in a single game. Arroyo was the main starter of the Spartans until Scott Rislov took the job in 2002. Arroyo graduated from San Jose State in 2003 with a degree in kinesiology.

Coaching career
Following his playing career, Arroyo took a coaching position with San Jose State as an undergraduate assistant coach in 2003. The next year, he went to Prairie View A&M University where he served as the offensive coordinator. After one season in this capacity, Arroyo returned to San Jose State as a graduate assistant coach under newly hired head coach Dick Tomey. He was promoted to a full-time position in 2006, becoming the Spartans quarterbacks coach. Arroyo added co-offensive coordinator duties in 2007. During his tenure he worked with quarterbacks Adam Tafralis and Kyle Reed. After the 2008 season concluded, Arroyo accepted the position of offensive coordinator and quarterbacks coach at the University of Wyoming. He joined the University of California, Berkeley as quarterbacks coach in February 2011, adding the title of passing game coordinator prior to the 2012 season. In January 2013, Arroyo was hired by head coach Todd Monken as the offensive coordinator and outside receivers coach at Southern Miss.  In January 2014, he was hired by head coach Lovie Smith to coach quarterbacks with the Tampa Bay Buccaneers.  Arroyo left Tampa Bay in January 2015 and joined the Oklahoma State University football coaching staff in February 2015 as the running back coach. 
Marcus was co–offensive coordinator with Mario Cristobal for the Oregon Ducks in 2017 under head coach Willie Taggart. He took over full offensive coordinator and play calling duties starting with the Las Vegas Bowl on December 16, 2017 under head coach Mario Cristobal. In the 2019, Oregon went 11-2 during the regular season, winning the North division, beating Utah in the PAC-12 Conference Championship Game. Oregon would finish the post season with a Rose Bowl victory over the Wisconsin Badgers. This was Arroyo's last game with Oregon before taking over head coaching duties at UNLV.

UNLV
On December 11, 2019, Arroyo was announced as the new head coach of the UNLV Rebels football program. In his first season as a head coach, he led the Rebels to an 0-6 record. Arroyo remained head coach through 2022, posting a record of 7–23. On November 28, 2022, UNLV fired Arroyo from the head coach position.

Personal life
Born in Sacramento, Arroyo grew up in Meadow Vista, California. He is married and has two children.

Head coaching record

References

External links
 UNLV profile
 Oregon profile
 San Jose State profile

1980 births
Living people
American football quarterbacks
California Golden Bears football coaches
Oklahoma State Cowboys football coaches
Oregon Ducks football coaches
Prairie View A&M Panthers football coaches
San Jose State Spartans football coaches
San Jose State Spartans football players
San Jose State University alumni
Southern Miss Golden Eagles football coaches
Tampa Bay Buccaneers coaches
UNLV Rebels football coaches
Wyoming Cowboys football coaches
People from Placer County, California
Players of American football from Sacramento, California
Coaches of American football from California